The Mysteries of Harris Burdick is a 1984 picture book by the American author Chris Van Allsburg. It consists of a series of images, ostensibly created by Harris Burdick, a man who has mysteriously disappeared. Each image is accompanied by a title and a single line of text, which encourage readers to create their own stories. Many famous writers have tried to put their own twists on the pictures.

The book is available in a Portfolio Edition which includes another image/caption pair from the story "Missing in Venice".

In 2011 a book titled The Chronicles of Harris Burdick: Fourteen Amazing Authors Tell the Tales was published, featuring stories by high-profile writers including Stephen King and Louis Sachar, inspired by the illustrations in the original The Mysteries of Harris Burdick.

Premise
An encounter between a children's book editor named Peter Wenders and an author and illustrator named Harris Burdick, who says he has 14 stories that he has written; he has brought one picture from each story with a caption. He leaves with a promise to deliver the complete manuscripts if the editor chooses to buy the books. The next day, Burdick did not show up. Burdick had mysteriously disappeared. Over the years, Wenders tried to find out who Harris Burdick was, but he never found out. Burdick was never seen again, and the samples are all that remain of his supposed books. Readers are challenged to imagine their own stories based on the images for the books.

In 1984, Chris Van Allsburg visited Wenders' office, and Wenders showed him Burdick's drawings. Van Allsburg decided that if he were to publish the drawings, they might find out who Harris Burdick was.

Both Wenders and Van Allsburg were sure that someone would come forward with information about Burdick. Then, in 1993, a dealer in antique books told them that he had purchased an entire library that had previously belonged to a recently deceased woman, including an antique mirror with portraits of characters from Through the Looking-Glass. The mirror fell from the wall and cracked open. Neatly concealed between the wooden frame and the mirror was an image similar to Burdick's other works; its caption identified it as being from the Burdick story "Missing in Venice".

As stated on the Burdick website, Peter Wenders died in 2000 at the age of 91.

Pictures
 Archie Smith, Boy Wonder
 Uninvited Guests
 The House on Maple Street
 Missing in Venice
 Under the Rug
 The Harp
 A Strange Day in July
 Another Place, Another Time
 Mr Linden's Library
 Oscar and Alphonse
 Just Dessert
 The Seven Chairs
 The Third Floor Bedroom
 Captain Tory
 Missing in Venice (second picture)

Influence
The short story "The House On Maple Street" which appears in Stephen King's Nightmares & Dreamscapes is inspired by the last image/caption in The Mysteries of Harris Burdick.

Film adaptation
Walt Disney Pictures and 20th Century Fox announced in July 2019 that they have acquired the film rights to "The Mysteries of Harris Burdick" with Rafe Judkins as screenwriter and Mike Weber, Bill Teitler, Ted Field, Shawn Levy and Dan Cohen producing. This announcement came after Disney and Fox acquired the film rights to another Van Allsburg book, The Garden of Abdul Gasazi, but unlike that adaptation, Van Allsburg is not an executive producer for this film.

References

External links
 The official site - Has a section where readers can write their own stories for the pictures. Winners get a copy of the Portfolio Edition of the book.
 Additional drawing signed by Allsburg

1984 children's books
American picture books
Novels by Chris Van Allsburg
Picture books by Chris Van Allsburg
Lost literature